Ravitz is a surname originating from the Polish town of Rawicz.

People with this surname include:
Avraham Ravitz (1934–2009), Israeli politician
Mel Ravitz (d. 2010), American professor, progressive politician, sociologist, and community advocate 
Michal Ravitz (born 1986), Israeli football defender
Natalie Ravitz, American communications director
Nate Ravitz, American sportswriter and show host
Rivka Ravitz (born 1976), Israeli political administrator
Yehudit Ravitz (born 1956), Israeli singer-songwriter, composer and music producer